Henricus perissus is a species of moth of the family Tortricidae. It is found in Carchi Province, Ecuador.

The wingspan is about 17.5 mm. The ground colour of the forewings is whitish grey, preserved in the postbasal and posterior parts of the wing, in the posterior area in the form of spots. The markings have the form of a pale rust-brown basal blotch, diffuse median fascia and grey subapical fascia. The hindwings are pale brownish, whiter basally and with brownish venation.

Etymology
The species name refers to the shape of the bursa copulatrix and is derived from Greek perisson (meaning uneven).

References

Moths described in 2007
Henricus (moth)